Romneya is a genus of flowering plants belonging to the poppy family (Papaveraceae). There are two species in genus Romneya, which was named for Irish astronomer John Thomas Romney Robinson. They are known commonly as Matilija poppies or tree poppies and are native to California and northern Mexico.

They are perennial subshrubs with woody stems. The silvery green leaves are deeply cut, with a small fringe of hairs at the margins.

They are notable for their large white flowers with intense yellow centers, blooming in summer. Romneya produce the largest flowers of any members of the poppy family. These flowers prefer a warm, sunny spot and fertile soil with good water drainage. They are not easily grown but once established are difficult to remove. In the wild, they are known as "fire followers" as they can be frequently, but not exclusively, found in burned areas. It is also known as the "fried egg flower" or "fried egg plant".

The two species are:
Romneya coulteri Harv. – Coulter's Matilija poppy
Romneya trichocalyx Eastw. – Bristly Matilija poppy. Some consider this a variety of Romneya coulteri, but it is accepted in recent manuals.

References

External links
California Native Plant Society: Romneya coulteri
California Native Plant Society: Romneya trichocalyx
USDA Plants Profile

Papaveroideae
Papaveraceae genera
Flora of California
Flora of Baja California